The 2014–15 Hofstra Pride men's basketball team represented Hofstra University during the 2014–15 NCAA Division I men's basketball season. The Pride, led by second year head coach Joe Mihalich, played their home games at Mack Sports Complex and were members of the Colonial Athletic Association. They finished the season 20–14, 10–8 in CAA play to finish in fifth place. They advanced to the semifinals of the CAA tournament where they lost to William & Mary. They were invited to the College Basketball Invitational where they lost in the first round to Vermont.

Previous season 
The Pride finished the season 10–23, 5–11 in CAA play to finish in eighth place. They lost in the second round of the CAA tournament to Delaware, after winning the first-round game against UNC Wilmington.

Off season

Departures

Incoming transfers

2014 Recruiting Class

Roster

Schedule

|-
!colspan=12 style="background:#16007C; color:#FFAD00;"| Non-Conference Regular Season

|-
!colspan=12 style="background:#16007C; color:#FFAD00;"| Conference Regular Season

|-
!colspan=12 style="background:#16007C; color:#FFAD00;"| CAA tournament

|-
!colspan=12 style="background:#16007C; color:#FFAD00;"| College Basketball Invitational

See also
2014–15 Hofstra Pride women's basketball team

Hofstra Pride men's basketball seasons
Hofstra
Hofstra